is a Japanese international rugby union player who plays in the loose forward position.   He currently plays for Toyota Verblitz in Japan's domestic Top League.

Early / Provincial Career

Ando has played all of his senior club rugby in Japan with Toyota Verblitz who he joined in 2010.   He is currently the club's captain.

Super Rugby Career

Ando was selected as a member of the first ever Sunwolves squad ahead of the 2016 Super Rugby season.   He played 7 matches in their debut campaign.

International

Ando has played twice for the Japanese national side, making his debut in a match against South Korea on April 30, 2016 and earning his second cap against  during the 2016 mid-year rugby union internationals series.

Super Rugby Statistics

References

1987 births
Living people
Japanese rugby union players
Japan international rugby union players
Rugby union flankers
Rugby union number eights
Toyota Verblitz players
Sunwolves players
Sportspeople from Akita Prefecture
Shimizu Koto Blue Sharks players